Frank Paul Geraci Jr. (born July 14, 1951) is a United States district judge of the United States District Court for the Western District of New York.

Early life and education

Geraci was born in 1951 in Rochester, New York. He received his Bachelor of Arts degree in 1973 from the University of Dayton. He received his Juris Doctor in 1977 from the University of Dayton Law School.

Legal career
From 1978 to 1983, he served as a Special Assistant District Attorney in the Monroe County District Attorney's Office. From 1983 to 1987, he served as an Assistant United States Attorney in the Western District of New York. Among the cases that Geraci handled while at the U.S. Attorney's Office was the prosecution of a group of self-styled mercenaries who engaged in an unsuccessful attempt to help imprisoned Philadelphia organized crime figure Stephen Vento and another man escape from the federal prison in Lewisburg, Pennsylvania.Self-Styled Mercenary Sentenced to 25 Years in Prison, Associated Press (November 19, 1986 ). 

Geraci was a partner at the law firm of Geraci & Feldman from 1987 to 1992. From 1992 to 1998, he was a judge of the Rochester City Court, presiding over civil cases, criminal misdemeanors and pre-trial felony matters. From 1999 to 2012, he served as a judge on the Monroe County Court in Rochester, New York, where he primarily handled criminal felonies.

Federal judicial service
On May 14, 2012, President Barack Obama nominated Geraci to be a United States District Judge for the United States District Court for the Western District of New York, to the seat vacated by Judge David G. Larimer, who assumed senior status in 2009. His nomination was approved on July 19, 2012, by the Senate Judiciary Committee and referred to the Senate floor for a confirmation vote. The full Senate voted in a voice vote to confirm Geraci on December 13, 2012. He received his commission on January 2, 2013. He served as Chief Judge from 2015 to 2021. He announced his intent to assume senior status on April 1, 2023.

Notable cases
In 2021, Geraci denied a petition for compassionate release from imprisoned Rochester organized crime figure Dominic Taddeo, convicted of racketeering and the slaying of three people in mob wars in 1982 and 1983. Geraci determined that Taddeo did not merit compassionate release.

References

External links

1951 births
Living people
Assistant United States Attorneys
Judges of the United States District Court for the Western District of New York
New York (state) state court judges
New York Supreme Court Justices
Lawyers from Rochester, New York
University of Dayton alumni
United States district court judges appointed by Barack Obama
21st-century American judges
American people of Italian descent